Echo, also known as Marshalls Cross Roads, is an unincorporated community in Dale County, Alabama, United States.

History
Traditional explanation holds the community was named when early settlers were constructing a log cabin and heard an echo as two logs hit each other. A post office operated under the name Echo from 1851 to 1904.

Company B (known as "The Dale County Grays") of the 33rd Regiment Alabama Infantry was partially made up of men from Echo. A portion of the 15th Regiment Alabama Infantry also came from Echo.

Demographics
Echo was listed on the 1880 U.S. Census as an unincorporated community with a population of 123.

References

Unincorporated communities in Dale County, Alabama
Unincorporated communities in Alabama